The 2019 Pan American Games medal table is a list of National Olympic Committees (NOCs) ranked by the number of gold medals won by their athletes during the 2019 Pan American Games, held in Lima, Peru from July 26 to August 11, 2019. Approximately 6,650 athletes from 41 NOCs will participate in 419 events in 39 sports.

The United States topped the medal count with 120 gold and 293 overall medals, its best result in the 21st century. Brazil pulled off its best performance in history, winning 54 gold and 169 overall medals, and finishing second in the standings. Mexico (37 golds) edged Canada (35), Argentina (33) and Cuba (33) in the battle for the third place. The Canadians, however, won the most total medals among the three, 152. For Cuba, it was their worst result since 1971 in terms of gold medals. For Chile, it was their best result in history in terms of golds and total medals.

Medal table
The ranking in this table is based on information provided by Panam Sports and is consistent with convention in its published medal tables. By default, the table is ordered by the number of gold medals the athletes from a nation have won (in this context, a "nation" is an entity represented by a National Olympic Committee). The number of silver medals is taken into consideration next and then the number of bronze medals. If nations are still tied, equal ranking is given and they are listed alphabetically by IOC country code.

In badminton, boxing, judo, karate, racquetball, taekwondo, table tennis, and wrestling two bronze medals will be awarded for each event. Also in bowling, fencing and squash two bronze medals will be awarded in some events. Therefore, the total number of bronze medals will be greater than the total number of gold or silver medals. The following is the medal table maintained by the official website of the games.

The British Virgin Islands won its first ever gold medal and its first ever Pan American Games medal after Chantel Malone won the women's long jump athletics event. Aruba also earned its first medal in the history of the Pan American Games, a bronze medal won by sailor Mack van den Eerenbeemt in men's RS:X. This means all current participating countries have now at least won one medal.

Barbados, Bolivia, Grenada and Paraguay also won their first ever gold medals at the Pan American Games.

Changes in medal standings

See also 
All-time Pan American Games medal table

References

Medal table
Pan American Games medal tables